Aerotaxis La Costeña S.A. is an regional airline based in Managua, Nicaragua. It operates passenger services from Managua to 6 domestic destinations. Its main hub is at Augusto C. Sandino International Airport.

History
The airline began operations in November 1991. It became part of the Grupo TACA in 1999 as a feeder carrier. By September 2011, it had 140 employees.

On May 31, 2019, Avianca Holdings sold its 62% participation in La Costeña to Regional Airlines Holding LLC, from Delaware, United States.

Destinations

La Costeña operates scheduled services to the following domestic destinations:

Fleet

Current fleet

La Costeña fleet consists of the following aircraft (as of December 2022):

Former fleet
2 Shorts 360

Accidents and incidents
On July 30, 1995, a Cessna 208B Grand Caravan (YN-CED) was hijacked by suspected drug traffickers while en route from Managua to Bluefields. On August 1, the body of the pilot was discovered in Zipaquirá, Colombia. He had reportedly been shot twice in the head and once in the back. Nicaraguan authorities suspect that the hijacked aircraft was destined for drug trafficking operations. In August, the plane was found by Colombian police in a hangar at Villavicencio-La Vanguardia Airport.
On July 20, 1999, the same aircraft (YN-CED) was flying from Managua to Bluefields, but crashed in Cerro Silva, killing both crew members and all 14 passengers. A GPS device had been removed for use in another aircraft before the flight.

See also
 List of airlines of Nicaragua

References

External links

 

Airlines of Nicaragua
Companies based in Managua
Avianca
Airlines established in 1991
1991 establishments in Nicaragua